Christina Yannetsos (born May 7, 1983) is a female judoka from the United States, who won the silver medal in the women's middleweight division (– 70 kg) at the 2003 Pan American Games in Santo Domingo, Dominican Republic. In the final she was defeated by Cuba's Regla Leyén. Christina graduated from the Medical College of Wisconsin in 2012, and is now an Emergency Medicine physician.

References
 

1983 births
Living people
American female judoka
Judoka at the 2003 Pan American Games
Pan American Games silver medalists for the United States
Pan American Games medalists in judo
Medalists at the 2003 Pan American Games
21st-century American women
20th-century American women